Harpursville United Methodist Church is a historic United Methodist church located at Harpursville in Broome County, New York.  It is a small, "T"-shaped one story building built in 1920.  The foundation, walls, and entrance tower are built of stone, while the upper portion of the walls are of wood-frame construction clad in stucco.  The building embodies features typical of the Gothic Revival style.

It was listed on the National Register of Historic Places in 2006.

References

Churches in Broome County, New York
National Register of Historic Places in Broome County, New York
Churches on the National Register of Historic Places in New York (state)
United Methodist churches in New York (state)
Churches completed in 1920
20th-century Methodist church buildings in the United States